The Pittsburgh Brass Manufacturing Company Building is a historic building in the Strip District neighborhood of Pittsburgh, Pennsylvania. It was built in 1903 by the Pittsburgh Brass Manufacturing Company as a production facility for brass and brass goods. The four-story building housed a foundry with coke furnaces for producing raw brass along with casting, rolling, and machining equipment for manufacturing finished products. Pittsburgh Brass used the building until the 1970s, after which it was left vacant for about 40 years. In 2015, the building was renovated and converted into 14 loft apartment units.

References

Industrial buildings and structures on the National Register of Historic Places in Pennsylvania
Industrial buildings completed in 1903
Residential buildings in Pittsburgh
National Register of Historic Places in Pittsburgh
1903 establishments in Pennsylvania
Industrial buildings and structures in Pittsburgh